Elisa Marie Thornam (12 March 1857 – 22 April 1901) was a Danish landscape painter and botanical illustrator who contributed to the Flora Danica and Botanisk Tidsskrift.

Life and career 

Thornam was born in Kongens Lyngby, Denmark. She died on 22 April 1901 in Copenhagen. Her father was the painter and botanical illustrator Johan Christian Thornam (1822–1908), who taught botanical illustration and served as artist on the Galathea Expedition of 1845. A landscape painter, Thornam was a student of painters Hans Fischer and Andreas Fritz. She colored her father's contributions to the Flora Danica botanical compendium, published 1761-1883. Thornam and her father also collaborated on illustrations for the 1866 Botanisk Tidsskrift, a Danish botanical journal.

Botanical illustrations

References

Bibliography 
 

1857 births
1901 deaths
Danish women painters
Danish women illustrators
19th-century Danish illustrators
Danish landscape painters
Botanical illustrators
Danish scientific illustrators
People from Kongens Lyngby